The Type 148 Tiger-class fast attack craft is a modification of the French  design for the German Navy.

Design 
The La Combattante IIas had been designed by Lürssen of Germany for Israel, but were built in France by Constructions Mécaniques de Normandie in Cherbourg (CMN) for political reasons. Eight of the boats were laid down by CMH, but completed by Lürssen.

Operational history 
The boats were commissioned into the Bundesmarine in the mid-1970s, replacing the Jaguar-class vessels of the 3rd and 5th Squadrons. At first the boats did not receive names, only numbers, but these were introduced later at the insistence of the crews.

The ships served for 30 years, and received major updates in 1982–84 and 1990–92. After decommissioning they were scrapped or sold to different countries. No direct replacements were procured as due to the changed operating conditions the Deutsche Marine has reduced the number of these fast attack boats drastically and procured instead a smaller number of corvettes.

Ship list

See also 
 La Combattante class fast attack craft

References

Notes

Bibliography

External links 
 Schnellboote TIGER-Klase  – Marine (Official homepage of the German Navy) 
 Warships on the Web
 S46 Fuchs 
 S51 Häher 
 S58 Pinguin 

Missile boat classes
Missile boats of Germany
Missile boats of the German Navy
Missile boats of the Chilean Navy
France–Germany military relations